Season 5 of the Indian competitive reality TV series MasterChef India premiered on Star Plus on 1 October 2016.

Vikas Khanna returned to judge this season while Sanjeev Kapoor and Ranveer Brar were replaced by Kunal Kapur and Zorawar Kalra respectively.

The winner was Kirti Bhoutika, a 20-year-old Nutrition graduate, with Ashima Arora being the runner-up.

Format
Top 30 contestants were chosen from India and even from the other parts of the world like San Francisco, London, etc. From the Top 30, Best 10 were chosen by a cook-off between 3 each and in the second-chance cook, 6 other were chosen.

Top 16

Elimination Table

 (WINNER) This cook won the competition.
 (RUNNER-UP) This cook finished in second place.
 (WIN) The cook(s) won the individual / pair challenge (Mystery Box Challenge or Invention Test or Elimination Test).
 (WIN) The cook was on the winning team in the Team Challenge and directly advanced to the next round.
 (TOP) The cook was one of the top entries in the individual challenge but didn't win.
 (WIN) The cook won the Ticket to Finale Challenge and was directly promoted as a finalist.
 (SAFE) The cook didn't participate in the challenge as he/she already advanced into the next round.
 (IN) The cook wasn't selected as a top or bottom entry in an individual / pair challenge.
 (IN) The cook wasn't selected as a top or bottom entry in a team challenge.
 (PT) The cook competed in the Elimination Test or Pressure Test (was on the losing team in the Team Challenge), and advanced. 
 (LOSE) The cook was on the losing team in the Team Challenge and had to compete in the upcoming Pressure Test.
 (WEAK) The cook was one of the bottom entries in an individual challenge.
 (BTM) The cook was one of the bottom entries in an individual challenge, and had to compete in the upcoming Elimination test.
 (WDR) The cook withdrew from the competition due to illness or personal reasons.
 (ELIM) The cook was eliminated from MasterChef.

Episodes

References

MasterChef India
2016 Indian television seasons